Yitong may refer to:

Yitong Manchu Autonomous County, in Jilin, China
Yitong Town, county seat of Yitong County, Jilin, China
Yitong River, in Jilin, China
Yitong Law Firm, in the People's Republic of China engaged in defense of human rights
Manchu chess, also known as Yitong.